Thomas Oliver Kite Jr. (born December 9, 1949) is an American professional golfer and golf course architect. He won the U.S. Open in 1992 and spent 175 weeks in the top-10 of the Official World Golf Ranking between 1989 and 1994.

Career
Kite was born in McKinney, Texas. He began playing golf at age six, and won his first tournament at age 11. Kite attended the University of Texas on a golf scholarship and was coached by Harvey Penick. He turned professional in 1972 and has been a consistent money winner ever since. Known for his innovation, he was the first to add a third wedge to his bag, one of the first players to use a sports psychologist, and one of the first to emphasize physical fitness for game improvement. He also underwent laser eye surgery, due to his partial blindness, in a bid to improve his game late in his career.

He has 19 PGA Tour victories, including the 1992 U.S. Open at Pebble Beach. He competed on seven Ryder Cup squads (1979, 1981, 1983, 1985, 1987, 1989, 1993) and served as the 1997 captain. Kite holds a unique record of making the cut for the first four U.S. Opens held at Pebble Beach: 1972, 1982, 1992, and 2000.  Kite also shares the distinction (with Gene Littler) of playing in the most Masters Tournaments without a win.

In 1989 he was named PGA of America Player of the Year; in 1981 the Golf Writers Association Player of the Year, the Vardon Trophy winner in 1981 and 1982, Bob Jones Award recipient in 1979 and Golf Digest Rookie of the Year in 1973.

Kite was the first in Tour history to reach $6 million, $7 million, $8 million, and $9 million in career earnings. He was the Tour's leading money-winner in 1981 and 1989. In his prime, Kite had few peers with the short irons. In 1993, Johnny Miller referred to Kite as "the greatest short-iron player the game has seen."

In 2005 he led the PGA Tour's Booz Allen Classic by one shot going into the final round at the age of 55. If he had been able to stay ahead he would have beaten Sam Snead's record as the oldest winner on the PGA Tour by three years, but he fell away to finish tied 13th, seven shots behind Sergio García.

Kite currently plays the over 50s Champions Tour, where he has ten victories including one senior major, The Countrywide Tradition. At the 2012 U.S. Senior Open, Kite shot a front nine 28 (seven under par) in the first round. This was the lowest nine-hole score ever recorded in any USGA championship. He finished the tournament tied for 12th.

In 1996, Kite had a cameo in The Simpsons episode "Scenes from the Class Struggle in Springfield", in which he gave Homer Simpson golf tips. 

Kite was inducted into the World Golf Hall of Fame in 2004.

Amateur wins
1972 NCAA Championship (individual; tie with Ben Crenshaw)

Professional wins (37)

PGA Tour wins (19)

*Note: The 1993 Nissan Los Angeles Open was shortened to 54 holes due to rain.

PGA Tour playoff record (6–4)

European Tour wins (3)

PGA Tour of Australasia wins (1)

Other wins (5)

Other playoff record (0–1)

Champions Tour wins (10)

Champions Tour playoff record (3–2)

Major championships

Wins (1)

Results timeline

CUT = missed the halfway cut (3rd round cut in 1982 Open Championship)
"T" indicates a tie for a place.

Summary

Most consecutive cuts made – 15 (1986 PGA – 1990 U.S. Open)
Longest streak of top-10s – 2 (four times)

The Players Championship

Wins (1)

Results timeline

CUT = missed the halfway cut
"T" indicates a tie for a place.

Senior major championships

Wins (1)

Results timeline
Results not in chronological order before 2021.

CUT = missed the halfway cut
WD = withdrew
"T" indicates a tie for a place
NT = No tournament due to COVID-19 pandemic
Note: The Senior British Open was not a Champions Tour major until 2003.

U.S. national team appearances
Amateur
Eisenhower Trophy: 1970 (winners)
Walker Cup: 1971

Professional
Ryder Cup: 1979 (winners), 1981 (winners), 1983 (winners), 1985, 1987, 1989 (tie), 1993 (winners), 1997 (captain)
World Cup: 1984, 1985
Four Tours World Championship: 1987 (winners), 1989 (winners)
Dunhill Cup: 1989 (winners), 1990, 1992, 1994
Wendy's 3-Tour Challenge (representing Champions Tour): 2000, 2002, 2003, 2004, 2006
UBS Cup: 2002 (winners), 2004 (winners)

See also
1972 PGA Tour Qualifying School graduates
List of golfers with most PGA Tour wins
List of golfers with most Champions Tour wins

References

External links

Tom Kite Design

American male golfers
Texas Longhorns men's golfers
PGA Tour golfers
PGA Tour Champions golfers
Ryder Cup competitors for the United States
Winners of men's major golf championships
Winners of senior major golf championships
World Golf Hall of Fame inductees
Golf course architects
People from McKinney, Texas
Golfers from Austin, Texas
1949 births
Living people